Shido may refer to:

A 'slight' or minor penalty in judo
Ali Shido Abdi, senior Somali politician and elder
Shido Fuyuki, a character in the Japanese manga and anime series GetBackers
Shido, Kagawa, a former town located in Ōkawa District, Kagawa Prefecture, Japan, now part of Sanuki
Matagu Shido, a character in the Japanese anime series Please Teacher!
Haruko Shido, a character in the Japanese anime series Please Twins!
Shido Itsuka, protagonist of the anime series Date A Live
Masayoshi Shido, an antagonist in Persona 5

Shidō may also refer to:

 Shidōkan (disambiguation)
 Nakamura Shidō (born 1972), better known by the stage name Nakamura Shidō II, Japanese kabuki and film actor
 Sidoh